Edward Joseph Gainor (August 1, 1870 – November 10, 1947) was an American labor unionist.

Born in Greencastle, Indiana, Gainor moved to Muncie, Indiana, working as a puddler and heater in a rolling mill.  He joined the Amalgamated Association of Iron and Steel Workers, and served as secretary of his local from 1890 to 1892.

In 1897, Gainor left the mill, and became a letter carrier.  He soon joined the National Association of Letter Carriers, and was elected to its executive in 1901.  He became vice-president of the union in 1905, and then in 1914 was elected as president of the union.

In 1916, Gainor moved to Washington, D.C.  In 1924, he represented the American Federation of Labor (AFL) at the British Trade Union Congress.  He served as a vice-president of the AFL from 1935.  Due to poor health, he retired from the Letter Carriers in 1941, and from the AFL in 1943.

References

1870 births
1947 deaths
American trade union leaders
People from Greencastle, Indiana
Trade unionists from Indiana
Amalgamated Association of Iron and Steel Workers people
National Association of Letter Carriers